Alexander Voulgaris is a Greek film director, screenwriter, composer and actor. Films Voulgaris wrote, directed and scored include Thread, Roz and Higuita.  His composing credits include The Last Note,  Park and The Sentimentalists, the latter of which garnered him a Hellenic Film Academy Award for "Best Music."

Voulgaris is frequently credited as "The Boy." He is the son of Pantelis Voulgaris and Ioanna Karystiani.

External links

Greek composers
Greek film directors
Greek screenwriters
Living people
1981 births
Film people from Athens